Moore Dome is an ice dome, circular in plan and  in extent, rising to  and forming the northwest portion of Bear Peninsula, on Walgreen Coast, Marie Byrd Land, Antarctica. It was mapped by the United States Geological Survey from aerial photographs taken by U.S. Navy Operation Highjump in 1947 and the U.S. Navy in 1966.

References

Ice caps of Antarctica
Bodies of ice of Marie Byrd Land